This article details Car Nos. 1–3 of the Manx Electric Railway on the Isle of Man.

These tramcars were original trio of tramcars supplied for the opening in 1893.  The two remaining cars hold a joint entry in the Guinness book of records as the oldest fully operational tramcars in the world that still operate on their original running lines.  No. 3 was destroyed by fire at Laxey Car Sheds in 1930 but the other two remain in service having survived the austerity years of the line as works cars when they had been relegated to permanent way hacks for many years.  The historical precedence of these vehicles was however acknowledged and in 1979, when the island celebrated the millennium of its Tynwald parliament, they were restored to original condition, proving the stars of the show at the line's centenary celebrations.  Subsequently, car 2 was partly repainted blue (with some historical precedent as it is believed cars may have originally been deep blue but lack of colour photography from the time cannot clarify this) but both cars are now in a variation of the 1930s "house" style and remain in service.

References

Also

Sources
 Manx Manx Electric Railway Fleetlist (2002) Manx Electric Railway Society
 Island Island Images: Manx Electric Railway Pages (2003) Jon Wornham
 Official Official Tourist Department Page (2009) Isle Of Man Heritage Railways

Manx Electric Railway